This article is about the particular significance of the year 1895 to Wales and its people.

Incumbents

Archdruid of the National Eisteddfod of Wales – Hwfa Môn

Lord Lieutenant of Anglesey – Richard Davies 
Lord Lieutenant of Brecknockshire – Joseph Bailey, 1st Baron Glanusk
Lord Lieutenant of Caernarvonshire – John Ernest Greaves
Lord Lieutenant of Cardiganshire – Herbert Davies-Evans
Lord Lieutenant of Carmarthenshire – John Campbell, 2nd Earl Cawdor
Lord Lieutenant of Denbighshire – William Cornwallis-West    
Lord Lieutenant of Flintshire – Hugh Robert Hughes 
Lord Lieutenant of Glamorgan – Robert Windsor-Clive, 1st Earl of Plymouth
Lord Lieutenant of Merionethshire – W. R. M. Wynne 
Lord Lieutenant of Monmouthshire – Henry Somerset, 8th Duke of Beaufort
Lord Lieutenant of Montgomeryshire – Sir Herbert Williams-Wynn, 7th Baronet 
Lord Lieutenant of Pembrokeshire – William Edwardes, 4th Baron Kensington
Lord Lieutenant of Radnorshire – Arthur Walsh, 2nd Baron Ormathwaite (until 12 September); Powlett Milbank (from 12 September)

Bishop of Bangor – Daniel Lewis Lloyd 
Bishop of Llandaff – Richard Lewis
Bishop of St Asaph – A. G. Edwards (later Archbishop of Wales) 
Bishop of St Davids – Basil Jones

Events
4 February – Penarth Pier is opened.
11 April – Rhos-on-Sea Pier is opened.
29 March – The National Trust acquires Dinas Oleu, Barmouth, its first property in the UK.
1 November – The last turnpike toll-gates in the UK are removed, from Llanfairpwllgwyngyll on Anglesey.

Arts and literature

Awards
National Eisteddfod of Wales – held at Llanelli
Chair – John Owen Williams, "Dedwyddwch"
Crown – Lewis William Lewis

New books

English language
Henry Jones – A Critical Account of the Philosophy of Lotze
Arthur Machen – The Three Impostors
William Retlaw Williams – The parliamentary history of the principality of Wales

Welsh language
Daniel Owen – Straeon y Pentan

Music
John Thomas Rees – String quartet

Sport
Golf – The Welsh Golfing Union is founded, and the first Welsh amateur golf championships are held.
Horse racing – The Welsh Grand National is held for the first time, at Ely Racecourse, Cardiff. A huge crowd breaks down barriers and almost overwhelms police trying to keep out gatecrashers.

Births
22 January – Iorwerth Thomas, politician (died 1966)
25 January – Mary Glynne, actress (died 1954)
8 February – Edward Enoch Jenkins, judge (died 1960)
19 February – Mary Dilys Glynne, plant pathologist and mountaineer (died 1991)
23 February – Wilfred Mitford Davies, artist (died 1966)
1 March – William Richard Williams, civil servant (died 1963)
11 March – Albert Jenkins, rugby player (died 1953)
3 April – Brinley Williams, Wales dual-code rugby international (died 1987)
14 April – Albert Evans-Jones ("Cynan"), poet and Archdruid (died 1970)
17 April – Thomas Hughes, clergyman, assistant Bishop of Llandaff (died 1981)
18 May – Tom Rees, airman, victim of the "Red Baron" (died 1916)
8 June – Idwal Jones, humorous writer (died 1937)
24 July – Robert Graves, Royal Welch Fusiliers officer, poet, novelist and classicist often resident in Wales (died 1985)
25 July – Sir Ifan ab Owen Edwards (died 1970)
14 September – George Harrison, Glamorgan cricketer (date of death unknown)
1 November – David Jones, poet and artist (died 1974)
24 November – William Evans, cardiologist (died 1988)

Deaths
8 January – Daniel Harper, academic, 73
15 January – Lady Charlotte Guest, translator of the Mabinogion, 82
16 February – Thomas Briscoe, academic, 81
18 February – James Goronwy Mathias, minister and writer, 53 
25 February – Henry Bruce, 1st Baron Aberdare, politician, 79
2 April – Ellis Thomas Davies, minister and author, 73
3 May – George Herbert, 13th Earl of Pembroke, 44
8 May – Thomas Jones (Tudno), poet, 51
13 July – John Griffin, Welsh international rugby player, 35
18 August – John Arthur Edward Herbert, High Sheriff of Monmouthshire 1849, 76
28 August – Henry Pochin, English industrial chemist, mine-owner and politician, founder of Bodnant Garden, 71
22 October – Daniel Owen, novelist, 59
23 November – William Davies (Pembrokeshire MP), 74
date unknown – David Lewis, Newmanite priest and academic (born 1814)

References

 
Wales